Griesbach is a developing, award-winning, community in Edmonton, Alberta, Canada. This mainly residential neighbourhood was formerly the site of a military base, part of CFB Griesbach. The land was transferred to Canada Lands Company to redevelop it. It remains a project of the Crown corporation.

The neighbourhood is bounded on the north by 153 Avenue, on the east by 97 Street, on the south by 137 Avenue, and on the west by Castle Downs Road. Travel north along 97 Street provides access to the current CFB Edmonton. Travel south along 97 Street provides access to the downtown core and the Northern Alberta Institute of Technology. The area is expected to be accessible by the Metro Line LRT in the future.

Shopping and services are available just east of the neighbourhood at Northgate Centre and North Town Centre. Both malls are located at the intersection of 137 Avenue and 97 Street at Griesbach's south east corner. Shoppers Drug Mart opened in November 2016 in Griesbach Village, located in the southeast corner of the neighbourhood.

The community is represented by the Griesbach Community League.

Demography 
According to the City of Edmonton's 2005 municipal census, the most common type of residence in Griesbach were single-family dwellings. These accounted for four out ten (41%) of all residences in the neighbourhood. Row houses accounted for another three out of ten (30%) of residences. Duplexes accounted for the remaining three out of ten (29%). Nine out of every ten (91%) were rented with only one in ten (9%) being owner occupied.

See also 
 CFB Griesbach
 Edmonton Federation of Community Leagues

References

External links 
 Griesbach Neighbourhood Profile

Neighbourhoods in Edmonton